Hawthorne Municipal Airport  (Jack Northrop Field) is an airport in Hawthorne, in Los Angeles County, California, United States.

Facilities
It is effectively crammed into a very small space and is surrounded by residential areas on all sides. The airport is also in very close proximity to the considerably larger Los Angeles International Airport, so special consideration must be given attention to avoid encroaching on the LAX airspace. 

FBOs:
 Hawthorne Hangar Operations
JetCenterLA

Airport businesses:	
 Star Helicopters
 Capital Jet Management

History
The name "Jack Northrop Field" comes from the Northrop Aircraft Corporation, founded by Jack Northrop, which for years designed, built and flew many classic airplanes including YB-35 flying wing, the  P-61 Black Widow and F-89 Scorpion night fighters, the F-5 Freedom Fighter, and the T-38 Talon jet trainer.

During World War II, the airfield was used by the United States Army Air Forces Air Technical Service Command as an aircraft modification center and Air Transport Command to ferry new aircraft to operational units.

SpaceX and its spinoff The Boring Company are headquartered at the southeast end of the airport. The Boring Test Tunnel cuts runs just under the fence line at the north-east corner before running under West 120th Street.  Tesla Design Studio is located at the airport as well.

Airline and destinations

See also

 California World War II Army Airfields

References

 Airport Master Record (FAA Form 5010), also available as a printable form (PDF)
 Hawthorne Municipal Airport (City of Hawthorne website)
 AirNav KHHR 
 Second FBO Opens at SoCal's Hawthorne Airport

External links

Airfields of the United States Army Air Forces in California
Airfields of the United States Army Air Forces Technical Service Command
Airports in Los Angeles County, California
Hawthorne, California